Mai Chia-je (25 February 1987 – 30 September 2020) was a Taiwanese baseball player who played for Brother Elephants of the Chinese Professional Baseball League. 

He was a pitcher and became the team's closer in the middle of the 2008 season. His career ended in 2009, following an investigation into . He died in a traffic collision on 30 September 2020. Mai's older brother  was also a baseball player.

Career statistics

References

External links

 

1987 births
2020 deaths
Brother Elephants players
Baseball players from Tainan
Taiwanese baseball players
Road incident deaths in Taiwan